Jessica Oyelowo (née Watson; born 1978) is a British actress and singer.

Early life
She was born Jessica Watson in Ipswich and spent her childhood in Suffolk, England. She attended Woodbridge School as a child and was a member of the National Youth Music Theatre.

Career
In 2006, she starred as Detective Sergeant Alex Jones in Mayo and went on to appear in Murphy's Law alongside James Nesbitt, in 2007. She provided the voice of Mrs. Equiano (alongside her husband as Olaudah Equiano) in Grace Unshackled – The Olaudah Equiano Story, a radio play adapting Equiano's 1789 autobiography The Interesting Narrative of the Life of Olaudah Equiano. This was first broadcast on BBC 7 on 8 April 2007.

Personal life
Oyelowo resides in Tarzana in the San Fernando Valley in Southern California with her husband, actor David Oyelowo. They met while attending the London Academy of Music and Dramatic Art. They have four children.  They formerly resided in Brighton, England.

Both she and her husband are committed Christians.

Oyelowo and her husband became naturalised US citizens on 20 July 2016.

As the wife of a Yoruba tribal prince, Oyelowo is entitled to the honorific style Olori. She currently doesn't make use of it, however.

Filmography

Film

Television

Stage work
 Cyrano de Bergerac (as Roxanne) at the Royal Exchange, Manchester, 2006  
 Ana in Love (play) at Hackney Empire for Inside Intelligence 2007
 As You Like It (Rosalind) for Inside Intelligence 1997, her professional debut

References

External links 

Mayo at BBC

1978 births
English television actresses
Living people
English Christians
People educated at Woodbridge School
20th-century English actresses
21st-century English actresses
British expatriate actresses in the United States
Actresses from Greater Los Angeles
Actors from Ipswich
Actresses from Suffolk
Naturalized citizens of the United States
Yoruba princesses
Princesses by marriage
21st-century American women